L'Ardève (1,501 m) is a mountain of the western Bernese Alps, overlooking the Rhone valley at Leytron, in the canton of Valais. It is elevated less than 200 metres above the nearby mountain resort of Ovronnaz, with high cliffs on its south side.

References

External links
L'Ardève on Hikr

Mountains of the Alps
Mountains of Valais
Mountains of Switzerland
One-thousanders of Switzerland